Laure Gardette (born 1969) is a French film editor.  Gardette was born in Lentigny.  She has edited such films as Polisse (for which she won a César Award), In the House and Young & Beautiful.

Filmography

External links

Living people
French film editors
1969 births
French women film editors